Mitchy-Yorham Ntelo Mbala (born 4 May 2001) is a Belgian professional footballer who plays as a forward for Belgian National Division 1 team Zébra Élites, the reserve squad of Charleroi.

Club career
Ntelo is a youth academy graduate of Standard Liège. On 23 July 2021, club announced that three players including Ntelo will join Dutch side MVV Maastricht on a season long loan deal. He made his professional debut on 9 August 2021 in a 1–0 league win against Jong Utrecht. On 20 August, he scored his first three goals in professional career in a 3–2 win against Helmond Sport.

In August 2022, Ntelo joined Charleroi on a two-year contract.

International career
Ntelo is a former Belgian youth international.

Personal life
Born in Belgium, Ntelo is of Congolese origin.

Career statistics

Club

References

External links
 

2001 births
Living people
Belgian people of Democratic Republic of the Congo descent
Association football forwards
Belgian footballers
Belgium youth international footballers
MVV Maastricht players
R. Charleroi S.C. players
Eerste Divisie players
Belgian National Division 1 players
Belgian expatriate footballers
Belgian expatriate sportspeople in the Netherlands
Expatriate footballers in the Netherlands